Roy Orbison's Many Moods, also known as The Many Moods of Roy Orbison, is the thirteenth album recorded by Roy Orbison, and his seventh for MGM Records, released in May 1969. It included two singles, both of which were minor hits in the UK; "Heartache", which just missed the Top Forty, stalling at #44, and "Walk On", which scraped into the same chart, stopping at #39.

Track listing
This album was only released in North America.

Engineered by Val Valentin
Tracks 2, 4, 8 Arranged by Jim Hall
Tracks 5, 9 Arranged by Emory Gordy, Jr.

Roy Orbison albums
1969 albums
Albums produced by Wesley Rose
MGM Records albums